Jacey Harper (born May 20, 1980) is a male sprinter athlete from Trinidad and Tobago. He competed in the men's 4 × 100 metres relay at the 2000 Summer Olympics.

Career 
A 100 metres specialist, Harper was a part of the Trinidad 4 × 100 m relay teams that won the bronze medal at the 2001 World Championships and the silver medal at the 2005 World Championships. He won the 100 m bronze medal at the 2006 CAC Games.

Following the ruling of December 13, 2005 which retroactively disqualified Tim Montgomery and henceforth the American team from the 2001 Championships, the Trinidad and Tobago athletes were promoted to silver medallists.

Achievements

References

External links
 

1980 births
Living people
Trinidad and Tobago male sprinters
Athletes (track and field) at the 1999 Pan American Games
Athletes (track and field) at the 2003 Pan American Games
Athletes (track and field) at the 2002 Commonwealth Games
Athletes (track and field) at the 2006 Commonwealth Games
Clemson Tigers men's track and field athletes
World Athletics Championships medalists
Athletes (track and field) at the 2000 Summer Olympics
Olympic athletes of Trinidad and Tobago
Central American and Caribbean Games bronze medalists for Trinidad and Tobago
Competitors at the 2006 Central American and Caribbean Games
Central American and Caribbean Games medalists in athletics
Commonwealth Games competitors for Trinidad and Tobago
Pan American Games competitors for Trinidad and Tobago